Behlmer Corner is an unincorporated community in Franklin Township, Ripley County, in the U.S. state of Indiana.

History
Behlmer Corner was originally called Lynnville, and under the latter name was laid out in 1844.

Geography

References

Unincorporated communities in Ripley County, Indiana
Unincorporated communities in Indiana